Kherameh County is in Fars province, Iran. The capital of the county is the city of Kherameh. At the 2006 census, the region's population (as Korbal District of Shiraz County) was 57,372 in 13,731 households. The following census in 2011 counted 61,580 people in 17,076 households, by which time the district had been separated from the county to form Kherameh County. At the 2016 census, the county's population was 54,864 in 16,874 households.

Administrative divisions

The population history and structural changes of Kherameh County's administrative divisions over three consecutive censuses are shown in the following table. The latest census shows two districts, five rural districts, and two cities.

References

Counties of Fars Province